"I Can't Turn the Tide" is a song written by Kathie Baillie, Michael Bonagura and Craig Bickhardt, and recorded by American country music group Baillie & the Boys.  It was released in November 1989 as the fourth single from the album Turn the Tide.  The song reached number 9 on the Billboard Hot Country Singles & Tracks chart.

Chart performance

Year-end charts

References

1990 singles
Baillie & the Boys songs
Songs written by Craig Bickhardt
Song recordings produced by Kyle Lehning
RCA Records singles
1989 songs
Songs written by Michael Bonagura